Reidar Thomassen, pseudonym Richard Macker (born 18 June 1936) is a Norwegian writer.

Biography 

He was born in Harstad as a son of Lieutenant Colonel Haakon Ivar Thomassen (1895–1982) and nurse Edith Mack (1905–94). The family also lived in Tromsø and Narvik in Thomassen's youth. From 1964 to 1979 he was married to teacher Inger Sofie Lund. He resides in Bærum.

He finished his secondary education in Narvik in 1956, took military training in Harstad and studied at the University of Oslo. He graduated with the cand.real. degree in geography in 1964. He worked as a teacher from 1965 to 1972 and editor from 1972 to 1985, among others for the magazine Teknisk Presse. In 1985 he took up writing full-time.

His debut novel was Konfrontasjonen (1969). Other memorable novels include Den tredje utvei (1970), Seminaret (1976) and Nina Ewert (2000). As a crime writer he uses the pseudonym Richard Macker; his crime debut was Mange om liket (1974). He has also written hundreds of crime short stories, and in 2003 he became the first Norwegian contributor to Ellery Queen Mystery Magazine. He was the screenwriter for the three television series Farlig yrke (1976), Solospill (1977) and Saken Ruth Vang (1981). He wrote one children's book and two textbooks on leadership.

He is also an active javelin thrower. His club is IL Tyrving, and his personal best throw as a young athlete was 63.31 metres in 1959.

References

1936 births
Living people
People from Harstad
University of Oslo alumni
Norwegian magazine editors
Norwegian screenwriters
20th-century Norwegian novelists
21st-century Norwegian novelists
Norwegian male short story writers
Norwegian male javelin throwers
Writers from Bærum
20th-century Norwegian short story writers
21st-century Norwegian short story writers
20th-century Norwegian male writers
21st-century Norwegian male writers